Paraclemensia cyanella is a moth of the  family Incurvariidae. It is found in France, Italy, Austria and Russia.

The wingspan is about 13.5 mm.

The larvae feed on Acer campestre and Acer monspessulanum.

References

Moths described in 1850
Incurvariidae
Moths of Europe